Bolovăneşti may refer to several villages in Romania:

 Bolovăneşti, a village in Ceru-Băcăinți Commune, Alba County
 Bolovăneşti, a village in Mușătești Commune, Argeș County